Srđan Branković is a Serbian guitar player and producer, best known as the member of the progressive/power metal band Alogia. He has had many performances with Alogia, most notably with the Symphony Orchestra and Vojkan Borisavljevic, as well as before the bands Whitesnake, Savatage, Apocalyptica, and in Bulgaria he performed in the backing band Michael Matijevic. In 2008 he was a guest on Shadow Gallery album, "Digital Ghost". In 2021, under the auspices of Frontiers Records, he will start a new band The Big Deal. In 2022, he appeared as a guitarist in the line-up on the first solo album of Rainbow singer Ronnie Romero. He also appeared as a representative / guitarist of his country on the Vivaldi Metal project, in a guitar duo with Chris Caffery.

Discography

Studio albums

Live albums

Video albums

Singles

References
 http://www.frontiers.it/news/11229/ The Big Deal & Frontiers]

External links
 Ronnie Romero announcement

1981 births
Living people
Serbian rock guitarists
Serbian heavy metal musicians
Musicians from Smederevo
Serbian record producers
21st-century guitarists